Guha Thakurta or Guhathakurta (pronounced ) is a British Raj era Zamindar family from Bengal Presidency.

History 

In 1889, Basanta Guhathakurta founded Banaripara Union Institution and requested his brother Rajoni Kanto Guhathakurta to take over the administration of the school. Rajoni Kanta agreed and joined the school as the first headmaster, resigning from the post of District Magistrate with the Government of British India. Currently, the school complex has been selected as a Model School by the Government of Bangladesh.

See also 
Banaripara
Bengali Hindus
Jyotirmoy Guhathakurta

References 

Indian noble families
Bangladeshi families
Zamindari estates
Bengali Hindus
Bangladeshi Hindus